Peetz is a surname. Notable people with the surname include:

Jake Peetz (born 1983), American football coach
Karen Peetz, American banker

See also
Beetz
Peetz, Colorado
Peetz Table Wind Energy Center